Vilnius District Municipality is one of 60 municipalities in Lithuania. It surrounds the capital city of Vilnius on 3 sides. The municipality is also bordering Trakai district and Elektrėnai municipality in the west, Belarus in the east, Širvintos, Molėtai and Švenčionys districts in the north and Šalčininkai district in the south.

The population of the district is one of the fastest growing in Lithuania because of migration of Vilnius' inhabitants to the suburbs and stood at 114,726 in January 2023, up from 84 thousand in the early 1990s or an increase by more than a third in less than 30 years.

History 

Vilnius district municipality is situated in the territory once settled by the Baltic , and numerous archaeological sites from this period are situated within its borders. There is some evidence that Bukiškis just north of Vilnius whose historic name was Gedvydžiai could be associated with Duke Gedvydas and through this link – with Mindaugas. According to Jan Długosz, the pagan ruler of Lithuania Algirdas was cremated in the sacred forest of Kukaveitis near Maišiagala after his death in Maišiagala castle in 1377. Nemenčinė (1338), Maišiagala (1254, 1365) and Medininkai (1387), known from written sources from the 13th-14th centuries, were among the oldest settlements in Lithuania. These were trade and defense centers with castles as well as religious centers – after the Christianization of Lithuania, early churches were built here. As Vilnius was the capital of the Grand Duchy of Lithuania, the territory around the city was forming the very center of the state, so-called Lithuania proper. It was the major part of a much larger  and later – Vilnius Voivodeship. After the partitions of the Polish-Lithuanian Commonwealth, Vilna Governorate was formed and Vilensky Uyezd occupied all of what is now Vilnius district municipality. When Vilnius and its suburbs in 1923 were incorporated into Interwar Poland, what is now Vilnius district municipality was the core of Wilno-Troki County. After World War II, Vilnius district municipality was formed. The initially small Vilnius district (938 km²) was soon significantly enlarged, absorbing Naujoji Vilnia district (in 1959) and Nemenčinė district (in 1962) and parts of Ukmergė district, but transferring some smaller administrative territories to Molėtai district and Švenčionys district, including Pabradė (in 1962). After 1962 (then 2313 km²), there were only minor administrative reforms, attaching some territories from Vilnius district municipality (now 2129 km²) to Vilnius city. In March 1987, the villages of Pašilaičiai, Fabijoniškės, Kelmija, Raisteliai and parts of the villages of Pavilionys, Baltoji Vokė, Prašiškės, Bajorai, Buivydiškės, Grigaičiai and Vanaginė were attached to Vilnius city. Almost all of the municipality belongs to the Vilnius urban belt, forming suburban environs of the capital city.

Some projects, that may have been changed the district radically were not implemented.

During the interwar period, hydropower plant was started to be built in 1938 only to be abandoned in 1940. The reservoir between Turniškės and Nemenčinė was not created. During the 70s, a plan to build a pumped storage plant in Sudervė was too dropped off and such a plant was built in Kruonis instead.

Demographics 

The district has significant Polish minority population in Lithuania, with 46% of the population claiming Polish ethnicity., but the number is dwindling from more than 80% in the late 1980s because of suburbanisation, age structure (younger newcomer inhabitants are mostly Lithuanians, while older population in villages are mostly Poles) and acculturation.

At the 2011 Census, Poles amounted to 52.07% out of 95,348 inhabitants. 32.47% were Lithuanians, 8.01% Russians, 4.17% Belarusians, 0.65% Ukrainians and 0.11% Jews.

In 2021, according to the census results, ethnographic composition was the following: Poles – 46.75%, Lithuanians – 38.52%, Russians – 7.35%, Belarusians – 3.26%, Ukrainians – 0.63%, Other – 0.86% and 2.64% of inhabitants did not declare their ethnographic identity.

Elderships 
The municipality is divided into 23 elderships:

Structure 

District structure.   
 1 city – Nemenčinė;
 4 small towns – Bezdonys, Maišiagala, Mickūnai, Šumskas
 1091 villages.

Largest residential areas by population (2011 or 2021 - if specified):  
 Nemenčinė  – 5,054
 Skaidiškės – 4,133
 Rudamina (Vilnius) – 3,981
 Pagiriai (Vilnius)  – 3,451
 Didžioji Riešė  – 2,520
 Nemėžis  – 2,498
 Avižieniai  – 2,125
 Valčiūnai  – 1,874
 Juodšiliai  – 1,744
 Zujūnai  – 1,660
 Maišiagala  – 1,636
 Kalveliai – 1,592
 Galgiai – 1,426
 Mickūnai – 1,389
 Grigaičiai – 1,325
 Buivydiškės – 1,314
 Vaidotai – 1,287
 Riešė – 1,234
 Gineitiškės – 1,093
 Kalviškės – 974
 Bajorai – 945 (2021)
 Bukiškis – 922
 Paberžė – 919
 Šumskas – 919
 Marijampolis – 870
 Rastinėnai – 805 (2021)
 Rukainiai – 770
 Bendoriai – 764
 Bezdonys – 743
 Didžiosios Kabiškės – 716
 Mostiškės – 631
 Lavoriškės – 621
 Sudervė – 588 (2021)
 Anavilis – 574
 Glitiškės – 549
 Lindiniškės – 534 (2021)
 Brinkiškės – 532 (2021)
 Vėliučionys – 516
 Medininkai – 493
 Papiškės – 489 (2021)
 Pikeliškės – 458 (2021)
 Keturiasdešimt Totorių – 451
 Melekonys – 450 (2021)
 Saldenė – 446 (2021)
 Viktariškės – 446 (2021)
 Kuprioniškės – 424 (2021)
 Skirgiškės – 423 (2021)
 Pakalniškės – 423 (2021)
 Pikutiškės – 402 (2021)
 Daržininkai – 401 (2021)
 Parudaminys - 397 (2021)
 Skaisteriai - 389 (2021)
 Kena - 369 (2021)

International relations

Twin towns — Sister cities
Vilnius District Municipality is twinned with:
 Radom, Poland

Gallery

References

 
Municipalities of Vilnius County
Municipalities of Lithuania